The Andinia Plan is a conspiracy theory that alleged plans to establish a Jewish state in parts of Argentina and Chile. It is partly based on an exaggeration of historical proposals for organized Jewish migration to Argentina in the late 19th and the early 20th century (which, however, did not include plans for a Jewish state there). The name and contents of the plan have wide currency on some circles of the Argentinian and Chilean right-wing, but no evidence of its actual existence has ever been brought up, making it, according to the US-based Anti-Defamation League and the Israeli research institute Jerusalem Center for Public Affairs, an example of a conspiracy theory.

This alleged plan has been used in Argentina as a rhetorical device by far right circles to attack Jews and Jewish institutions. In 1971 a leaflet appeared among officers in the Argentinean army under the name "Plan Andinia," which accused international Jewry and Zionists of planning to take over southern Argentina. It has been circulating ever since.

Jewish migration to Argentina and early Zionist plans 

Starting in 1880, Argentine governments had a policy of massive immigration, and the liberal tendencies of the Roca administration were instrumental in making European Jews feel welcome.

Maurice de Hirsch sponsored the Jewish Colonization Association, initially promoted by French rabbi Zadoc Kahn, for the support of agricultural settlements, and the idea was seriously considered as an alternative to Palestine by leading Zionists. It is unclear if Theodor Herzl seriously considered this alternative plan, however, these plans only included a local Jewish autonomy, rather than an independent Jewish state. The notion of a Jewish homeland, not in Palestine, but elsewhere in the world, such as a region of South America or in East Africa, eventually led to the schism of the Jewish Territorialist Organization. The actual early 20th-century Jewish settlement effort was rather focused on the other extremity of the country, Entre Ríos Province and surroundings, where it coexisted alongside other European settlements.

The Jewish population in Argentina grew and prospered in the ensuing years, though the community eventually became much more urban.

Conspiracy theory 
The extreme right-wing had a strong foothold in the Argentine military, mostly through the teachings of Jordán Bruno Genta. In these circles, the Andinia Plan was sometimes assumed to be a fact, even though the Zionist movement had abandoned all plans related to Argentina decades ago, and Argentine Jewish institutions (headed by Delegación de Asociaciones Israelitas Argentinas) were recognized by (and conversant with) all Argentine governments, including military juntas.

Later versions of the Plan, as published in Argentine Neo-Nazi media in the 1970s, involved an alleged Israel with the intention to conquer parts of Patagonia in Argentina's south, and declare a Jewish state. This theory did not take hold in mainstream political discourse. Many Israelis tour South America, some of them immediately after their military service as a gap year experience, with Patagonia being a favored destination, this is believed by conspiracy theories to be attempts to carry out the aforementioned Andinia Plan. However, there are strong reasons to doubt the relationship of these facts with the materialization of a plot to make Patagonia a second Israel, of which there is no evidence according to academic studies and the facts.

During the 1976–1983 dictatorship, some Jewish prisoners of the armed forces, notably Jacobo Timerman, were tortured for information about the Andinia plan, and were asked to provide details regarding the alleged preparations of the Israel Defense Forces for the invasion of Patagonia.

Timerman recalled details of the interrogation about the Plan Andinia – and his response to the absurdity of such a concept – in Preso Sin Nombre, Celda Sin Número (Prisoner Without A Name, Cell Without A Number).

On December 27, 2011, Israeli tourist Rother Singer started an accidental fire in Torres del Paine National Park, Chilean Patagonia. Singer was taken into custody by Chilean police and entered a plea in which he agreed to pay 4.8 million Chilean pesos (US$10,000) to CONAF and leave the country. This caused rage amongst some Chileans, who expected a prison sentence, with some protesters gathering outside the courthouse. In 2015, Chilean Supreme Court ratified the sentence. This case was reported in national and international media, introducing the "Plan Andinia" concept into the common Chilean knowledge, leading that in 2012, some Chilean politicians including members of the National Congress from the Christian Democratic Party and the Party for Democracy alleged that the fire in the Chilean Patagonia was in some way connected to the Andinia plan, prompting condemnation from the ADL.
In a February 2017 interview, the director of Conaf Magallanes stated that according to park statistics for the past five years, Israeli tourists accounted for almost two thirds of expulsions from Parque Nacional Torres del Paine, resulting in local hostels not taking in Israeli nationals 

In 2020, the documentary, Plan Andinia: A New Jewish State?, by Asela Villar, suggesting Israel is slowly planning to invade Patagonia, was aired on the Iranian channel HispanTV and replayed online, on Real Stories network, belonging to Little Dot Studios and All3Media, for which Pablo Iglesias Turrión, worked before co-founding Podemos, the left-wing political party he led from 2014 until his resignation in 2021.

See also 
 Judeopolonia
 Proposals for a Jewish state

References

External links 
 
 
 
 

Conspiracy theories involving Israel
Conspiracy theories involving Jews
Antisemitism in Argentina
Neo-Nazism in Argentina
Jewish Argentine history
Antisemitic forgeries